Psaltis (Greek: Ψάλτης) is a surname. Notable people with the surname include: 

 Dawn Marie Psaltis (born 1970), American actress and professional wrestler
 Demetri Psaltis (born 1953), Greek-American electrical engineer
 Edward Psaltis (born 1961), Australian ocean racing skipper and yachtsman
 Iakovos Psaltis (born 1935), Greek weightlifter
 Jim Psaltis (born 1927), American football defensive back
 Paris Psaltis (born 1996), Cypriot football defender
 Stathis Psaltis (1948–2017), Greek actor

See also 
Cantor (Christianity)

Greek-language surnames
Surnames